South Dundas is a municipality in eastern Ontario, Canada, in the United Counties of Stormont, Dundas and Glengarry along the north shore of the St. Lawrence River. It is located approximately 100 kilometres (60 miles) south of Ottawa and is midway between Kingston and Montreal, Quebec.

Communities
The Municipality of South Dundas comprises a number of villages and hamlets, including the following communities:

 The western portion, in the former Matilda Township: Brinston, Dixons Corners, Dundela, Glen Stewart, Hanesville, Hulbert, Irena, Iroquois, Stampville; Haddo, Pleasant Valley, Rowena, Toyes Hill; Iroquois Beach, New Ross, Oak Valley (partially), Pinetree Point, Rapide Plat Point, Robertson Point, Straders Hill
 The eastern portion, in the former Williamsburg Township: Dunbar, Elma, Glen Becker, Morrisburg, Riverside Heights, Williamsburg, Winchester Springs (partially); Archer, Beckstead, Boucks Hill, Colquhoust, Froatburn, Grantley (partially), Hoasic, Mariatown, Nudell Bush, Orchardside; Colquhoun, Crysler Beach, Doran Point, Marina Bay, Morrisburg Beach, Muttonville, The Sixth, Whitney Point

The municipal administrative offices are located in Morrisburg.

History
The county was named in 1792 to honour Henry Dundas, who was Lord Advocate for Scotland and Colonial Secretary at the time. Matilda and Williamsburgh were two of Upper Canada's original eight Royal Townships. The northern portions of Matilda and Williamsburg townships were separated in 1798 to form the new townships of Mountain and Winchester within Dundas County.

The McIntosh apple was discovered and cultivated in South Dundas near Williamsburg. John McIntosh's parents emigrated from Inverness, Scotland to the Mohawk Valley in New York, and John moved to Upper Canada in 1796. In 1811 he acquired a farm in Dundela, and while clearing the land of second growth discovered several apple seedlings. He transplanted these, and one bore the superior fruit which became famous as the McIntosh Red apple. John's son Allan established a nursery and promoted this new species extensively. It was widely acclaimed in Ontario and the northern United States, and was introduced into British Columbia about 1910. 

During the War of 1812, several battles were fought in Dundas County, present day South Dundas. The Battle of Matilda, Battle of Doran's Farm, and the Battle of Crysler's Farm were all fought in Dundas along the St. Lawrence River. As well, the Dundas Militia built numerous earthworks and breastworks along the river to fortify the area from attack, in 1814, the earthwork at Point Iroquois was expanded to include a blockhouse, but due to the construction so late in the war, and the relative peace, the fort was called Fort Needless.

Morrisburg took its name from James Morris, Canada's first postmaster general.  Morris also played an important role in canal-building in the area.

James Pliny Whitney, Ontario's sixth premier, is buried here in the cemetery of Holy Trinity Anglican Church in  Riverside Heights, just east of Morrisburg and north of County Road 2 (formerly Highway 2).  Whitney was born in Williamsburg in 1843, represented Dundas County in the Legislature from 1888 to 1914 and served as Premier from 1905 to 1914.

Morrisburg and Iroquois were partially flooded by the creation of the St. Lawrence Seaway in 1958. Unlike the Lost Villages of Cornwall and Osnabruck Townships, however, the two towns were simply relocated to higher ground in the same area. There was an international design competition in 1954 to design the new Iroquois townsite. Canadian-British architect Wells Coates was among those who submitted redevelopment concepts.

An artificial lake, Lake Saint Lawrence, now extends from a hydroelectric dam at Cornwall to the control structure at Iroquois, and replaces the formerly narrow and turbulent section of river that was impassable to large vessels. It replaces, in part, the Long Sault rapids.

Several buildings from the Lost Villages were moved to a site near Morrisburg to create Upper Canada Village, a living museum which depicts 19th century life in Upper Canada.

In 1976, stuntman Ken Carter attempted to jump a one-mile portion of the Saint Lawrence River by taking a one million dollar Lincoln Continental rocket car off an eight-storey ramp. This was billed as The Super Jump. The ramp and its runway were located in a field just west of Hanes Road, South of County road 2. The ramp has since been demolished, but the concrete runway still exists as of 2012.

The municipality was established on January 1, 1998, with the amalgamation of the former townships of Matilda and Williamsburg, along with the former villages of Iroquois and Morrisburg.

Charles A. Barkley, who was elected mayor of the municipality in the 2006 municipal elections, died unexpectedly on June 17, 2009. He had been a municipal politician since 1981, when he joined the Township of Matilda council. He was succeeded by deputy mayor Robert Gillard.

Demographics

Transportation

The only provincial highway directly serving the municipality is Highway 401. All other highway routes in the municipality, including Highway 2 and Highway 31, were decommissioned by the province in the 1990s, and were folded into Stormont, Dundas and Glengarry's county road system. Highway 416, the main route from the 401 to Ottawa, has its southern terminus at  
Johnstown in the neighbouring township of Edwardsburgh/Cardinal.

Morrisburg is served by a small, unattended airport adjacent to Upper Canada Village. Iroquois is served by a small unattended airport near the locks.

Sport

The Morrisburg Lions of the Eastern Ontario Junior B Hockey League play out of the Morrisburg Arena.

Thoroughbred racing pioneer Francine Villeneuve grew up in the community of Winchester Springs.

See also
List of townships in Ontario

References

External links

Lower-tier municipalities in Ontario
Municipalities in the United Counties of Stormont, Dundas and Glengarry
Ontario populated places on the Saint Lawrence River